Coffee production in Jamaica began after 1728, when governor Sir Nicholas Lawes introduced the crop near Castleton, north of Kingston. Jamaican Blue Mountain Coffee is the special variety of coffee that is grown in the Blue Mountains region, which has the most conducive climate and topographical features; this variety is known for its scent and sweet taste. Most of Jamaica's coffee production is grown for export.

Plantation
Most of the coffee grown on the island is a derivative of the Brazilian variety known as Coffea arabica Typica, constituting 70% of the yield, while other varieties grown are hybrid varieties of caturra, geisha, etc. The coffee that is grown in the Blue Mountains region, known as the Jamaican Blue Mountain Coffee, is said to be of very high quality and is mostly exported. Farming methods are specifically oriented towards a high rate of production with optimum acidity.

Regulation
The Ministry of Agriculture and its subordinate office, the Jamaica Agricultural Commodities Authority   (previously the Coffee Industry Board), are responsible for all activities of the coffee sector. The Coffee Industry Development Company (CIDCO) (was set up by what was then the Coffee Industry Board) assumes direct responsibility for coffee production and also to render assistance to farmers owning  or more of land dedicated to this crop.

The Coffee Industry Regulation Act specifies what coffee may use the Blue Mountain label, and also restricts the use of the Blue Mountain trademark to production authorised by the Jamaica Agricultural Commodities Authority  broadly speaking, coffee harvested from the parishes of Saint Andrew, Saint Thomas, Portland, and Saint Mary may be considered Blue Mountain coffee.

Production

According to FAO statistics for 2013, Jamaican coffee production was 6,984 tons, representing about 0.1% of world production. For the period from 1981 to 2013, the lowest production was 958 tons in 1979 and the highest was 15,117 tons in 2007.

Coffee is an export commodity. As it is labour-intensive, it provides employment to a large extent to the rural and urban people of the country right through the stages of production, processing, and sale. Requirement for export has exceeded production. More than 80 per cent of the production of Jamaican Blue Mountain Coffee is exported to Japan. In 2005, there was a shortfall in this export on account of destruction to the crop resulting from the Hurricane Ivan in the later part of 2004.

See also

Tia Maria
Economy of Jamaica

References

Bibliography

Jamaica
Agriculture in Jamaica
Jamaica–Japan relations